In mathematics and physics, a traveling plane wave is a special case of plane wave, namely a field whose evolution in time can be described as simple translation of its values at a constant wave speed , along a fixed direction of propagation .

Such a field can be written as  

where  is a function of a single real parameter . The function  describes the profile of the wave, namely the value of the field at time , for each displacement . This plane too travels along the direction of propagation  with velocity ; and the value of the field is then the same, and constant in time, at every one of its points.

Properties
A traveling plane wave can be studied by ignoring the dimensions of space perpendicular to the vector  ; that is, by considering the wave  on a one-dimensional medium, with a single position coordinate .

Moreover, a traveling plane wave  of any shape satisfies the partial differential equation

Plane traveling waves are also special solutions of the wave equation in an homogeneous medium.

See also
 Spherical wave
 Spherical sinusoidal wave
 Standing wave

References

Waves